Ogleidis Suárez is a Venezuelan model and professional boxer. She held the WBA female featherweight title in 2013, having been promoted from interim champion, a title she held from 2011. Suárez also held the WBA female interim super featherweight title in 2014 and challenged for the IBF female light middleweight title in 2019.

Professional career
Suárez made her professional debut on 7 Dec 2006, scoring a second-round technical knockout (TKO) victory against Luz Darys Giraldo at the Centro de Convenciones Atlapa in Panama City.

After compiling a record of 5–0–1 (4 KOs), she defeated Magdalena Leija via seven-round unanimous decision (UD) on 18 September 2008, capturing the vacant WBA Fedelatin female super bantamweight title at the Centro de Convenciones Figali in Panama City. All three judges scored the bout 70–63. She lost the title three fights later, suffering the first defeat of her career against Chantal Martínez by way of split decision (SD) on 21 July 2009. One judge scored the bout 68–67 in favour of Suárez while the other two judges scored it 68½–68 and 68½–65¼ for Martínez. After four consecutive wins, Suárez faced Martínez for a second time on 2 October 2010, attempting to regain the WBA regional title in a bout which served as an eliminator for the WBA's world super bantamweight title. In the second defeat of her career, Suárez lost via fifth-round TKO.

She bounced back with three wins before defeating Katy Wilson Castillo via SD on 22 October 2010, capturing the vacant WBA female interim super bantamweight title at the Roberto Durán Arena in Panama City. Two judges scored the bout 96–94 in favour of Suárez while the third judge scored it 97–93 for Castillo. After two successful defences of her interim title in 2012, Suárez was elevated to full WBA champion in May 2013. The first defence of her title came against Liliana Palmera on 10 August 2013, at the Megapolis Convention Center in Panama City. Suárez retained her via UD, with two judges scoring the bout 99–91 while the third judge scored it 97–93. She lost the title in her next fight, suffering a UD defeat against Edith Soledad Matthysse on 13 December 2013, at the Teatro Griego Juan Pablo Segundo in San Martín, Argentina, with the judges' scorecards reading 100–90, 99–91 and 97–93.

Suárez moved up in weight for her next fight, defeating Calista Silgado via UD to capture the vacant WBA female interim super featherweight title on 10 May 2014, at the Polideportivo José María Vargas in La Guaira, Venezuela. Two judges scored the bout 99–91 and the third judge scored it 96–94.

After two years away from the ring following a pregnancy, Suárez returned on 18 June 2016, defeating Yarley Cuadrado via third-round knockout (KO) at the Polideportivo José María Vargas, capturing the vacant WBA female Fedelatin light middleweight title.

She won her next eight bouts before challenging for the IBF female light middleweight title against reigning champion Marie-Eve Dicaire. The bout took place on 23 November 2019, at the Videotron Centre in Quebec City, Canada. Suárez suffered the fourth defeat of her career, losing via UD with the judges' scorecards reading 100–90, 100–90 and 99–91.

Professional boxing record

References

External links

Living people
Date of birth missing (living people)
Year of birth missing (living people)
Sportspeople from Caracas
Venezuelan women boxers
Super-bantamweight boxers
Super-featherweight boxers
Welterweight boxers
Light-middleweight boxers
World featherweight boxing champions
World Boxing Association champions